Avetisyan is an Armenian surname. Notable people with the surname include:

 Arsen Avetisyan (born 1973), an Armenian football player
 Erdzhanik Avetisyan (born 1969), an Armenian and Russian sport shooter
 Hunan Avetisyan (1913–1943), a Soviet senior sergeant awarded the title Hero of the Soviet Union
 Khachatur Avetisyan (1926–1996), an Armenian-Soviet composer
 Minas Avetisyan (1928–1975), an Armenian painter
 Varduhi Avetisyan (born 1986), an Armenian swimmer

See also
 Avedisian
 Avetis (disambiguation)

Armenian-language surnames